Yamaska was a federal electoral district in Quebec, Canada that was represented in the House of Commons of Canada from 1867 to 1935.

It was created by the British North America Act, 1867, which preserved existing electoral districts in Lower Canada.

In 1924, it was defined as consisting of the County of Yamaska, and the township of Upton in the County of Drummond.

The electoral district was abolished in 1933, when it was re-distributed into Nicolet—Yamaska, Drummond—Arthabaska and Richelieu—Verchères ridings.

Members of Parliament

This riding elected the following Members of Parliament:

Election results

See also 

 List of Canadian federal electoral districts
 Past Canadian electoral districts

External links 
 Riding history from the Library of Parliament

Former federal electoral districts of Quebec